Sir Sacheverell Reresby Sitwell, 7th Baronet (15 April 1927 – 31 March 2009) was the head of the Sitwell family, and owner of Renishaw Hall, Derbyshire.
 
The elder son of Sir Sacheverell Sitwell, 6th Baronet, he was educated at Sandroyd School then Eton College and King's College, Cambridge, but left the latter of his own volition without a degree.  He married Penelope Forbes, the niece of Bernard Forbes, 8th Earl of Granard, in 1952. He was succeeded in the baronetcy by George Sitwell, the son of his brother Francis, who died in 2004, and his sister-in-law Susanna Cross. 
Due to Sir Reresby and his brother being "never in harmony", he bequeathed Renishaw Hall to his daughter (and only child) Alexandra, Mrs Rick Hayward.

He was the nephew of poet and critic Dame Edith Sitwell. During his lifetime, Sitwell wrote a new variation upon the Robin Hood tale, was a partner in a wine business with Bruce Shand, and became known for his support of the arts and the upkeep of Renishaw Hall.

He served as High Sheriff of Derbyshire in 1983.

References

1927 births
2009 deaths
Alumni of King's College, Cambridge
Baronets in the Baronetage of the United Kingdom
English people of Canadian descent
Grenadier Guards officers
High Sheriffs of Derbyshire
People educated at Eton College
People educated at Sandroyd School
Reresby